Numbers  is the second album from Los Angeles-based punk rock band The Briggs.

Track listing 
"3rd World War" 3:25
"Media Control" 3:06
"Bored Teenager" 3:26
"Face Off" 2:09
"Dead Men (Don't Tell Tales)" 2:35
"Red Alert" 2:56
"My Defense" 2:36
"13197" 3:10
"Voice Box" 2:37
"Keep Us Alive" 3:25
"Down" 2:25
"Head Shrink, Dead Shrink" 2:39
"These Streets" 2:38
"Heroes by Choice" 2:50

Personnel
 Jason LaRocca – guitar, vocals
 Joey LaRocca - vocals, guitar
 Duck Matthews – bass guitar, backing vocals
 Chris X - drums

References

The Briggs albums
2006 albums
SideOneDummy Records albums
Skate punk albums